Badaguan is a historical mansion area located near the coastline in the city of Qingdao, Shandong, China.

Badaguan is made up of streets named after great military forts of the ancient times. It was originally a residential area for the Germans built when Qingdao was a German protectorate (1897–1914).  Each street is lined with a single species of tree and many street names are colloquially known by the trees that line them. Along the streets are houses built in a variety of European architectural styles. Badaguan is bordered on the west by No. 1 Beach and on the east by No. 3 Beach. Badaguan is a popular destination for wedding photography.  One can often see dozens of newlywed-couples being photographed along Badaguan's shoreline and greenspace.
 
Next to Badaguan, on the south end of No. 2 Beach, is a large rocky outcropping on which a stone Russian villa was constructed. Built in 1932, Huashi Lou combines Greek, Gothic, and Gothic influences throughout its five storey hulk. It is constructed from marble and stone and features a large turret and a multicolored outer face which inspired the locals' nickname for the structure, "the colorful rock building". It also contains a passageway which Chiang Kai-shek used to get from the building to the seashore.

The streets of Badaguan
These streets run north-south:
Zijingguan Road
Ningwuguan Road
Shaoguan Road

These streets run east-west:
Wushengguan Road
Jiayuguan Road
Hanguguan Road
Zhengyangguan Road
Linhuaiguan Road
Juyongguan Road
Shanhaiguan Road

Festival on Badaguan 
An annual festival of "Badaguan Beer Festival" is held from August 10 to 25, during which period there is such a variety of holiday events as musical instruments performance, dance performance, and beer-drinking competition.

See also
 List of tourist attractions in China

Notes

References 
. "Badaguan." China Connection Tours. China Connection Tours, 2012. Web. 19 Jul 2012. <http://www.china-tour.cn/Qingdao/Ba-Da-Guan.htm>. 
https://web.archive.org/web/20120521195905/http://www.funtouristattractions.com/a/ba-da-guan-scenic-area-qingdao-china/76

. " 青岛八大关别墅群." 青岛旅游. 青岛旅游, 2012. Web. 19 Jul 2012. <http://qingdao.cncn.com/jingdian/badaguan/>.

. "Badaguan Scenic Area · 八大关." Fun Tourist Attractions. Funtouristattractions.com, 2010. Web. 19 Jul 2012. <https://web.archive.org/web/20120521195905/http://www.funtouristattractions.com/a/ba-da-guan-scenic-area-qingdao-china/76>.

. "Qingdao Attractions." China Holidays. Chinaholidays.com, 2012. Web. 19 Jul 2012. <http://www.chinaholidays.com/guide/cities/qingdao-attractions.html >.

Buildings and structures in Qingdao
Major National Historical and Cultural Sites in Shandong
Tourist attractions in Qingdao